The Opera School Wales is a postgraduate training school for operatic performers.  The school is based in Craig-y-Nos, south Powys, Wales.

The Opera School Wales was formed by Brendan Wheatley and Bridgett Gill in 1987 when the school offered its first residential postgraduate training course in Brecon, Powys.

Since 2002 the school has been based at Craig-y-Nos, a Gothic castle once occupied by Italian soprano singer Adelina Patti.

References

External links
Opera School Wales

Opera in the United Kingdom
Classical music in Wales
Arts organisations based in Wales
1987 establishments in Wales
Educational institutions established in 1987